Cen Nanqin (born September 26, 1983 in Ceheng county, Guizhou) is a Chinese female slalom canoeist who competed at the international level from 2006 to 2018. She won a silver medal in the C1 event at the 2011 ICF Canoe Slalom World Championships in Bratislava.

In 2010 she won the inaugural world cup title in women's C1 discipline and finished the season as the World No. 1.

At 2014 Asian Games she won a gold medal in the women's slalom C1 event.

World Cup individual podiums

1 Asia Canoe Slalom Championship counting for World Cup points

References

External links 
 

1983 births
Living people
People from Qianxinan
Sportspeople from Guizhou
Chinese female canoeists
Asian Games gold medalists for China
Asian Games medalists in canoeing
Canoeists at the 2014 Asian Games
Medalists at the 2014 Asian Games